Lij Abiye Abebe (born 1918 – 23 November 1974) was an Ethiopian politician and son-in-law of Emperor Haile Selassie.

Biography 
Son of Liqa Mequas Abebe Atnaf Seggad, Abiye was born 1918 in Addis Ababa as a Lij. He attended the Holeta Military Academy. In the 1940s and 1950s he was Minister of Defence, and later served as Minister of Justice and Minister of the Interior. He chaired the High National Security Commission during the Ethiopian Revolution until his arrest by the Derg on 16 July 1974. Lt. General Abiye was serving as Chief of the General Staff when he was arrested.

According to John Spencer, when Prime Minister Aklilu Habte-Wold sought to resign his post in 1973, he suggested to the Emperor that he be replaced by General Abiye. Other sources indicate that Aklilu Habte-Wold's rival Prince Asrate Kassa was the person who put General Abiye forward as a fellow aristocrat. However Abiye consented to becoming Prime Minister only if his nomination, and those of his cabinet, were approved by the Ethiopian parliament, a condition Emperor Haile Selassie found unacceptable. As a result, Haile Selassie decided to appoint Endelkachew Makonnen Prime Minister instead. Abiye was one of 60 former government officials executed the night of 22–23 November at Akaki Central Prison by the Derg.

General Abiye was married three times. At Addis Ababa, on 26 April 1942, he married Princess Tsehai of Ethiopia who died in childbirth a year later. After this marriage, Lt. General Abiye Abebe was accorded the dignities and protocol rank of the Emperor's son-in-law, even after he remarried. In 1946, married Woizero Amarech Nasibu, and then later to Woizero Tsige, his widow.

Career history 

 Brigadier-General (24 April 1942)
 Governor-General of Wollega province (1942–1943)
 Minister for War 1949–1955; Acting (1943–1947)
 Minister of Justice (1958–1961)
 Minister of Interior (1961–1964)
 Ambassador to France (1955–1958)
 Viceroy of Eritrea (1959–1964) 
 President of the Ethiopian Senate (1964–1974)
 Minister for Defence and Chief of Staff (28 February 1974 – 22 July 1974)

Honours

National 
  Grand Cross of the Order of Menelik II
  Military Medal of Merit of the Order of St George
  Haile Selassie I Gold Medal
  Patriot Medal & three torches (1944)
  Refugee Medal (1944)
  Jubilee Medal (1955)
  Jubilee Medal (1966)

Foreign 
  Knight Gran Cross of the Royal Norwegian Order of Saint Olav (Kingdom of Norway, January 1956)
  Knight Grand Cross of the Order of Legion of Honour (French Republic)
  Knight Grand Cross of the Royal Order of Sahametrei (Kingdom of Cambodia, 4 January 1968)
  British Star (United Kingdom, 1939–1945)
  Africa Star (United Kingdom, 1940–1943)
  British War Medal (United Kingdom, 1939–1945)
 National Order of Merit (France)

References

1918 births
1974 deaths
Ethiopian generals
Defence ministers of Ethiopia
Honorary Knights Commander of the Order of the British Empire
Grand Croix of the Légion d'honneur
Grand Crosses of the Royal Order of Sahametrei
Executed Ethiopian people
20th-century Ethiopian politicians
Recipients of orders, decorations, and medals of Ethiopia